Capo or capos, may refer to:

Designation, akin to captain
Capo, short for Caporegime, a rank in the Mafia
Capo dei capi, or capo di tutti capi, Italian for "boss of bosses", a phrase used to indicate a powerful individual in organized crime
Capo (concentration camp), a prisoner who supervised forced labor or carried out tasks delegated by Nazi guards

People
Capo (surname)
Pedro Capó, or "Capó", singer-songwriter from Puerto Rico
Capo (rapper) (born 1991; as Cem Anhan) aka Capo Azzlack; German rapper
Jim Jones (rapper) (born 1976; as Joseph Guillermo Jones II), pseudonym "CAPO"; U.S. rapper
Los Capos, Mexican Lucha Libre pro-wrestlers

Places
Acquarica del Capo, town and commune in the Italian province of Lecce in the Apulia region of southeast Italy
Capistrano Valley High School, commonly known as Capo
Capo d'Orlando, a commune in the Italian province of Messina, in Sicily
Capo di Ponte, a commune in the Italian province of Brescia, in Lombardy
Capo Sandalo Lighthouse, a lighthouse on San Pietro Island, Sardinia, Italy
Capo Vaticano, a wide bathing place of the Municipality of Ricadi in Calabria, Italy
Rural Municipality of Elcapo No. 154, Saskatchewan, Canada

Music
Capo (musical device), a device that is attached to the frets of a string instrument to raise the pitch of each string
Capo (album), a 2011 album by American rapper Jim Jones
El Capo (album), a 2019 album by Jim Jones
”Capo”, a 2018 single by American rapper NLE Choppa

Other uses
Harkonnen Capo Chair, one of H. R. Giger's furniture designs
El Capo (TV series), 2009 Colombian drama TV series about a drug lord, aka Marlon Moreno El Capo
El Capo (2016 TV series), Mexican telenovela

See also

 
 
 
Da capo (disambiguation)
Kapo (disambiguation)
Capo di tutti capi (mafioso title) boss of all bosses
Capodecina (mafioso title) boss of a squad in the Cosa Nostra
Capomandamento (mafioso title) boss of a clan in the Cosa Nostra
el Capo de Capos (born 1949) Mexican pro-wrestler
Il Capo dei Capi, a 2007 TV miniseries